Parliamentary elections were held in Portugal on 22 March and 12 April.

Results

References

1868
1868 elections in Europe
1868 in Portugal
March 1868 events
April 1868 events